The 1917 Massachusetts gubernatorial election on November 6, 1917.

Republican primary

Governor

Candidates
Grafton D. Cushing, former Lieutenant Governor and former Speaker of the Massachusetts House of Representatives
Samuel W. McCall, incumbent Governor

Results

Lieutenant Governor

Candidates
Calvin Coolidge, incumbent Lieutenant Governor

Results
Lieutenant Governor Coolidge was unopposed for the Republican nomination.

Democratic primary

Governor

Candidates
Frederick Mansfield, former Treasurer and Receiver-General of Massachusetts and nominee for Governor in 1916

Results
Mansfield was unopposed for the Democratic nomination.

Lieutenant Governor

Candidates
Matthew Hale, delegate-at-large to the 1917 Constitutional Convention and former publisher of the Boston Journal

Results
Hale was unopposed for the Democratic nomination.

General election

Candidates
 James Hayes, perennial candidate from Plymouth (Socialist Labor)
 Chester R. Lawrence, perennial candidate from Boston (Prohibition)
Frederick Mansfield, former Treasurer and Receiver-General (Democratic)
Samuel W. McCall, incumbent Governor (Republican)
 John McCarty, perennial candidate from Abington (Socialist)

Results

See also
 1917 Massachusetts legislature

References

Bibliography

 

Governor
1917
Massachusetts
November 1917 events